(surname Etō, born 1924 in Ōita – died 24 December 2012) was a blind Japanese musician who played the koto. He began musical training at the age of eight with the renowned master Michio Miyagi. When he was eleven, he composed his first work and by the age of sixteen, he had received three consecutive grand prizes as an artist and composer from the national ministry and guild.

Eto moved to the United States in the 1950s intending to popularize the koto in the Western world. By the mid-1960s, he became a well-known figure in United States music recitals and concerts. He worked most notably with the American composer Henry Cowell on his Concerto for Koto and Orchestra, on which Eto was a soloist playing alongside the Philadelphia Orchestra conducted by Leopold Stokowski at the Philadelphia Academy of Music in December 1964.

Albums
Sound Of The Koto (1958)
Koto Music (World Pacific Records, 1959)
Koto & Flute (World Pacific Records, 1960) with Bud Shank
Art Of The Koto (Elektra Records, 1962)
Koto Master (World Pacific Records, 1963)
Sound Of The Koto (compilation, él Records, 2013)

See also
Koto (musical instrument)

References

External links
Kimio Eto page

1924 births
2012 deaths
Blind musicians
Japanese male musicians
Japanese musicians
Koto players
Place of birth missing